Skåne Western is one of the multi-member constituencies of the Riksdag, the national legislature of Sweden. As of the 2018 Swedish general election, Skåne Western elected 11 of the 349 members of the Riksdag.

Skåne Western contains eight municipalities: Höganäs, Helsingborg, Bjuv, Landskrona, Svalöv, Eslöv, Höör, and Hörby.

Skåne Western is one of the four constituencies in Skåne County, along with Skåne Southern, Skåne Northern and Eastern and Malmö Municipality.

Results

2018

References

Riksdag constituencies
Skåne County